Barat Habib gizi Shakinskaya (28 June 1914 – 14 January 1999) was an Azerbaijani and Soviet stage and film actress.

Biography
Barat Shakinskaya was born into a bey family in Shusha, Russian Empire (now Azerbaijan). Her mother Aghja (née Hajiyeva) was the niece of Azerbaijani writer and dramatist Abdurrahim bey Hagverdiyev. Her father hailed from the khans of Karabakh on his mother's side and from the khans of Shaki on his father's side. The name Barat means 'God-given', a name chosen by her grandmother Govhar, as Barat was the first surviving child in the family following three her still-born siblings. Later Habib and Aghja Shakinskis became parents to two more children, Suleyman and Sariyya. Barat got primary education in Shusha. After the Eleventh Red Army annexed Azerbaijan in 1920, her father fled to Iran as a political immigrant, while her mother and the children relocated to Ganja and maintained contact with Habib Shakinski until 1928, when the Soviet-Iranian border closed and they were compelled to cease contact with him.

Shakinskaya participated in the female drama club of Ganja at the age of 13. In 1935, she began to play at the Azerbaijan State Academic Drama Theatre. Barat Shakinskaya became the first Azerbaijani actress to play male roles. The part of Kostya played by her at the Ganja Theatre and also Napoleon's part played in Baku, in 1934 were particularly noteworthy. The actress played children's roles too. Her last children's role of Nazly, a pupil of the seventh grade from Mahammadhuseyn Tahmasib's play Blossoming Dreams, she played while she was at the age of 37 herself.

In 1935, Barat Shakinskaya began to participate at radio programs on the initiative of Mustafa Mardanov, People's Artist of Azerbaijan.

In 1949, she was conferred a title of People's Artist of the Azerbaijan SSR.

Shakinskaya was married to director Mehdi Mammadov.

Filmography

References

See also
List of People's Artists of the Azerbaijan SSR

1914 births
1999 deaths
Actors from Shusha
Azerbaijani film actresses
Azerbaijani stage actresses
Soviet film actresses
Soviet stage actresses
Burials at II Alley of Honor
People's Artists of the Azerbaijan SSR